Ampohibe is a commune in northern Madagascar. It belongs to the district of Antalaha, which is a part of Sava Region. The municipality has a populations of 14,433 inhabitants (2019).

Only primary schooling is available in town. The majority 99.9% of the population are farmers.  The most important crop is vanilla, while other important products are coffee and rice.  Services provide employment for 0.1% of the population.

References and notes 

Populated places in Sava Region